51 Documents: Zionist Collaboration with the Nazis is a 2002 book by the American Trotskyist and anti-Zionist Lenni Brenner. The book presents 51 documents that Brenner argues show that Zionist leaders collaborated with fascism particularly in Nazi Germany in order to build up a Jewish presence in Palestine. The book continues themes explored in Brenner's earlier and highly controversial work Zionism in the Age of the Dictators.

The book is split into five sections:

Zionism and anti-Semitism before Hitler
The World Zionist Organization and Nazism Before the Holocaust
Zionist Revisionism, Fascism, and Nazism Before the Holocaust
The World Zionist Organization During the Holocaust
The Stern Gang and the Nazis

References

2002 non-fiction books
Books critical of Zionism
Jewish anti-Zionism
History books about Zionism
Jewish collaboration with Nazi Germany